Los Angeles Heat joined the Western Soccer Alliance in 1986. They joined the American Professional Soccer League in 1990 when the WSL merged with the American Soccer League, then folded in 1990. The club played in Torrance, California at West High School until their demise.

The club folded in early 1991 following a season of low attendance and the lack of a suitable stadium after an announced move to Orange County. The Heat had accumulated $30,000 in unpaid bills and were one of several APSL teams to fold.

Ownership and staff
 John Ajemain - President / Co-Owner (1990–91)
 Roland Martin - Co-Owner / Founder (1986–91)
 Lionel Conway - Co-Owner (1990–91)
 Eugene Schiappa - Co-Owner / Founder (1986–91)
 Dave Graefe - Co-Owner / Founder (1986–91)
 Mike Hogue - General Manager (1986–89)
 Dick White - General Manager (1990–91)
 Jill Fracisco - General Manager (1989–90)
 Bobby Bruch - Community Services Director
 Dawn Smith - Public Relations Director

Coaching staff
 Wim Suurbier (1986)
 Marine Cano (1987-88)
 Bobby Sibbald (1989–90) Head Coach
 John Britton - Player/Assistant Coach (1986-1988, 1990). Head Coach (1988-1989)
 Justin Fashanu - Player/Assistant Coach (1989)

Year-by-year

References 

Heat
Defunct soccer clubs in California
Western Soccer Alliance teams
Soccer clubs in California
American Professional Soccer League teams
1986 establishments in California
1990 disestablishments in California
Association football clubs established in 1986
Association football clubs disestablished in 1990